Anastasia Potapova defeated Veronika Kudermetova in the final, 6–3, 6–1 to win the singles title at the 2022 İstanbul Cup. It was her maiden WTA Tour title.

Sorana Cîrstea was the defending champion, but lost in the semifinals to Kudermetova.

Seeds

Draw

Finals

Top half

Bottom half

Qualifying

Seeds

Qualifiers

Lucky losers

Draw

First qualifier

Second qualifier

Third qualifier

Fourth qualifier

Fifth qualifier

Sixth qualifier

References

External links
 Main draw
 Qualifying draw

2022 İstanbul Cup – 1
2022 in Turkish tennis
2022 WTA Tour
2022 in Istanbul